Pseudolynchia are genus of biting flies in the family of louse flies, Hippoboscidae. There are 5 known species. One of the more well known species is the  pigeon louse fly Pseudolynchia canariensis. All species are parasites of birds.

Systematics
Genus Pseudolynchia Bequaert, 1926 
Species group 'a'
P. serratipes Maa, 1966
Species group 'b'
P. brunnea (Latreille, 1812)
P. canariensis (Macquart, 1840)
P. garzettae (Rondani, 1879)
P. mistula Maa, 1969

References

Parasites of birds
Hippoboscidae
Hippoboscoidea genera
Taxa named by Joseph Charles Bequaert